Daniel Scavino Jr. is an American political adviser who served in the Trump administration as White House Deputy Chief of Staff for Communications from 2019 to 2021 and Director of Social Media from 2017 to 2021. Scavino previously was the general manager of Trump National Golf Club Westchester and the director of social media for the Donald Trump 2016 presidential campaign.

Early life and education
Scavino was born in New York and is of Italian descent. He was raised in the New York City area. In 1992, Scavino was selected as a caddie for Trump's golf party at Briar Hall Country Club (later renamed Trump National Golf Club Westchester). He graduated from the State University of New York at Plattsburgh in 1998 with a Bachelor of Arts degree in communications.

Career 
Scavino worked for a few years at Coca-Cola and Galderma before becoming general manager of Trump National Golf Club Westchester.

Trump presidential campaign
Scavino was involved with Donald Trump's presidential campaign since it began in June 2015. In February 2016, Trump appointed Scavino as the campaign's director of social media. Over July 4, 2016 weekend, controversy arose when Trump's Twitter account posted an image selected by Scavino of Hillary Clinton with a text in the shape of a Star of David calling her the "Most Corrupt Candidate Ever." The image had originally appeared on an anti-Semitic, white supremacist message board. Trump's team defended its use saying that the star was a "sheriff's badge", before eventually deleting it and posting a new picture with a circle replacing the star.

White House

On December 22, 2016, Scavino was named White House Director of Social Media under President Donald Trump.

In April 2017, ethics attorney Richard Painter accused Scavino of violating the Hatch Act of 1939 (which bars executive branch employees from engaging in electoral activities) after Scavino, from his personal Twitter account had called for defeating Congressman Justin Amash. The United States Office of Special Counsel then informed Scavino that his tweet had indeed violated the Hatch Act and warned future violations "could result in further action." In May 2019, Politico reported that Scavino frequented the r/The_Donald subreddit.

On June 18, 2019, USA Today released an article stating that Scavino writes several of Trump's tweets, most likely those sent between 10 a.m. and 6 p.m. and those without spelling mistakes. However, Scavino is quoted that "Trump does his own tweets."

Scavino was the longest-serving aide in the Trump Administration. He remained as Director of Social Media until the end of Trump's term as president.

On September 24, 2021, the U.S. House of Representatives committee investigating the January 6 2021 United States Capitol attack subpoenaed Scavino for records and testimony relating to the incident. Scavino has been evading investigators.  On April 6, 2022, the House of Representatives voted to hold Scavino and Peter Navarro in contempt for their refusals to testify before the House Select Committee on the basis of Executive Privilege claims.

Personal life
Daniel and Jennifer Scavino were married in 2000; they have two children. His wife filed for divorce in January 2018.

References

External links
 

|-

1976 births
American people of Italian descent
Living people
New York (state) Republicans
Donald Trump and social media
State University of New York at Plattsburgh alumni
Trump administration personnel